Jacob Aaron Cantor (December 6, 1854 – July 2, 1921) was an American lawyer and politician from New York who served as a United States representative from 1913 to 1915.

Early life and education
Cantor was born at 19 Second Street in New York, the son of Henry Cantor and Hannah Cantor, both natives of London. He was a reporter for the New York World from 1872 to 1877. At the same time, he studied law at the City College of New York, graduated in 1875.

Family 
On November 2, 1891, his first wife Julia (Lewenthal) Cantor died. On September 25, 1897, he married Lydia Greenbaum, and they had three children: Margaret, Ruth and John.

Career 
Cantor was admitted to the bar and commenced practice in New York City.

Early political career 
He was a delegate to the 1884 Democratic National Convention. He was a member of the New York State Assembly (New York Co., 23rd D.) in 1885, 1886 and 1887. He was a member of the New York State Senate from 1888 to 1898, sitting in the 111th through 121st New York State Legislatures (all three 20th D.); and was President pro tempore from 1892 to 1893.

He was Borough President of Manhattan from 1902 to 1903, elected on the fusion ticket headed by Seth Low for Mayor of New York City, nominated by the anti-Tammany Hall Democrats, Republicans and the Citizens Union.

Congress 
Cantor was elected as a Democrat to the 63rd United States Congress to fill the vacancy caused by the resignation of Francis Burton Harrison, and served from November 4, 1913, to March 3, 1915. He unsuccessfully contested the election of Isaac Siegel to the 64th United States Congress.

Later career and death 
Afterwards he resumed the practice of law in New York City.

He was president of the New York City Department of Taxes and Assessments from 1918 until his death.

Personal life 
Cantor died at his home at 2345 Broadway, in Manhattan, and was buried at the Mt. Hope Cemetery in Hastings-on-Hudson, New York.

See also
List of Jewish members of the United States Congress

Sources

 Political Graveyard
 Obit in NYT on July 3, 1921 (stating wrong years of his majority leadership)
 Obit of his first wife, in NYT on November 3, 1891

1854 births
1921 deaths
Democratic Party New York (state) state senators
Majority leaders of the New York State Senate
Manhattan borough presidents
Jewish members of the United States House of Representatives
Democratic Party members of the New York State Assembly
American people of British-Jewish descent
Democratic Party members of the United States House of Representatives from New York (state)